Elvanlı is a village in Mersin Province, Turkey.

Geography 
Elvanlı is a part of Erdemli district which itself is a part of Mersin Province. The population of the village was 2224 as of 2012. By this population it is more populous than most of other villages (and some towns) around.

History 
The name of the village refers to a certain Elvan Bey who founded the village in the 14th century. Elvan Bey was a Turkmen leader and it is claimed that he was probably a member of Karamanids house which established the Beylik of Karaman. During Ottoman Empire era, Elvanlı was a seat of bucak (subcounty). But later on a nearby village Tömük, which was a former hamlet of Elvanlı, became a local center of attraction and Elvanlı partially lost its former importance.

Economy 
Elvanlı is one of the wealthier villages of Mersin Province. Several kinds of citrus fruit are produced in large quantities. The village is also famous for its picnic area called Dedekavak.

References 

Villages in Erdemli District